Newworldson is a Canadian Christian pop/soul band based in St. Catharines, Ontario. Their musical style is very eclectic, but is principally soul music. The band is signed to Inpop Records and has toured extensively with the Newsboys. The band has toured in North America, Europe, and Australia and New Zealand.

History
The band was formed in a jazz bar in downtown St. Catharines, Ontario, Canada and released its debut album, Roots Revolution, in 2005.

Critical reception and charting
Newworldson's Salvation Station was selected as one of the twenty best albums of 2008 by Cross Rhythms, while Christianity Today voted Salvation Station No. 3 on their list of Best Christian Albums of 2008.  The album hit No. 26 on Billboard magazines's Top Heatseekers chart in 2008, and 34 on the Top Christian Albums chart.  The band's third album is the self-titled Newworldson contained the single "There is a Way", which reached No. 2 on Billboard's Christian Songs chart on March 20, 2010.

Members 

 Current
 Joel Parisien – vocals, keyboards (2006–present)
 Mark Rogers – drums (2006–present)
 Leroy Emmanuel – guitar, vocals (2012–present)
 John Irvine – bass, vocals (2012–present)
 Darryl Dixon – alto saxophone (2012–present)
 Dave Watson – tenor, baritone saxophone (2012–present)

 Former
 Rich Moore – bass, vocals (2006-2012)
 Joshua Franklin Toal – guitar, vocals (2006-2012)

Discography

Studio albums

Live albums

EPs

Singles

Songs on compilations
 YourMusicZone.com No. 1s, "Down From The Mountain" (CMC, 2007)
 Canada Rocks, "Salvation Station" (CMC, 2008)
 Now Hear This: Winter 2010 Sampler, "You Set the Rhythm" (Sparrow, 2010)
 WOW New & Next, "You Set The Rhythm" (EMI CMG, 2010)

Awards and recognition
Gospel Music Association Canada Covenant Awards
 2007 New Artist of the Year
 2007 Folk/Roots Album of the Year: Roots Revolution
 2008 Folk/Roots Album of the Year: Salvation Station
 2009 Group of the Year
 2010 Folk/Roots Album of the Year: Newworldson
 2010 Recorded Song of the Year: "There Is A Way"
 2010 Pop/Contemporary Song of the Year: "There Is A Way"

Juno Awards
 2008 nominee, Contemporary Christian/Gospel Album of the Year: Roots Revolution
 2009 nominee, Contemporary Christian/Gospel Album of the Year: Salvation Station
 2011 nominee, Contemporary Christian/Gospel Album of the Year: Newworldson

References

External links
 
 Newworldson bio at Christianity Today. Retrieved 2009-05-18.
 Newworldson bio at CCM Magazine. Retrieved 2009-02-14.

Musical groups established in 2006
Musical groups from St. Catharines
Canadian Christian rock groups
Inpop Records artists
2006 establishments in Ontario